Festningsporten Pass is an ice-covered gap in the middle of the north face of Festninga Mountain leading to the mountain's flat summit, in the Mühlig-Hofmann Mountains, Queen Maud Land, Antarctica. it was mapped by Norwegian cartographers from surveys and air photos by the Sixth Norwegian Antarctic Expedition (1956–60) and named Festningsporten (the fortress gate).

References 

Mountain passes of Queen Maud Land
Princess Martha Coast